Rock Star Supernova is the only studio album by American hard rock supergroup Rock Star Supernova, released on November 21, 2006, through Mark Burnett Productions and Epic Records. The band was formed during the second season of the Rock Star TV series, which was called Rock Star: Supernova. The album received mainly negative reviews and only charted at number 101 on the Billboard 200. However the album charted at #4 on the Canadian Albums Chart and was certified Platinum (over 100,000 units sold).

Background

Rock Star Supernova band members: Tommy Lee (Mötley Crüe), Jason Newsted (Voivod and ex-Metallica) and Gilby Clarke (ex-Guns N' Roses) formed the basis of the second season of the Rock Star television program on CBS in the quest to find a lead singer. The show began online on the Rock Star web site on MSN on Monday, July 3 with an Internet exclusive weekly episode and premiered on CBS on July 5, 2006. Votes were cast via the Rock Star website. On September 13, 2006, Lukas Rossi was crowned the winner.

Release and reception

Upon release, Rock Star Supernova entered the Billboard 200 charts at number 101 selling 17,000 copies in the first week. The album also debuted at number 87 in Australia and number 4 in Canada.

Professional music critics mostly offered negative reviews of the album. Stephen Thomas Erlewine, senior critic of AllMusic, wrote, "At no point does this band make sense ... it's gloriously bad, the kind of music that can only result when three talented musicians are contractually obligated to work with a wannabe singer who would be a laughing stock on a local level." Christian Hoard of Rolling Stone thought the album had a few bright spots, "but most of the tunes feel tired, if not retrograde: Opener 'It's On' could have come from Collective Soul, the ballads suck, and there are some dark, sub-Alice in Chains bangers."

Track listing

Personnel

Rock Star Supernova
Lukas Rossi – lead vocals, rhythm guitar
Gilby Clarke – lead guitar
Jason Newsted – bass
Tommy Lee – drums

Additional musicians
Butch Walker
Scott Humphrey
Chad Stewart
Josh Freese
Jason Freese
Nate Morton
Rafael Moreira
Sofi Toufa

Production personnel
Butch Walker – production
Mike Shipley – mixing
Brian Wohlgemuth – mixing assistance
Ted Jensen – mastering

Charts

Certifications

References

External links
30 second preview of all the tracks

2006 debut albums
Rock Star Supernova albums
Albums produced by Butch Walker
Epic Records albums